William Ewart Hiscock,  (13 January 1886 – 15 February 1942) was a Royal Navy officer who was awarded the George Cross for the "great gallantry and undaunted devotion" he displayed in September 1941 in attempting to defuse a novel Italian 'Torpedo Machine' in St George's Bay, Malta, during the Second World War.

George Cross citation
His award was published in the London Gazette on 16 June 1942:

Death
Hiscock and his wife Alice Beatrice Hiscock were killed when an enemy bomb landed directly on their home in St George's Barracks on 15 February 1942.

References

1886 births
1941 deaths
Military personnel from Dorset
People from Dorchester, Dorset
Royal Navy officers
Royal Navy officers of World War II
British recipients of the George Cross
Royal Navy recipients of the George Cross
Royal Navy personnel killed in World War II
Bomb disposal personnel
Deaths by airstrike during World War II
Burials in Malta